The ATS D6 was a Formula One racing car manufactured and raced by the Team ATS during the 1983 Formula One season. It was powered by the BMW M12/13 4-cylinder turbocharged engine but the team failed to score any points.

Development
The D6 was designed by Gustav Brunner, who based the chassis around a carbon-fibre monocoque. To replace the previous year's Cosworth DFV V8, team owner Günter Schmid arranged a supply of BMW M12/13 4-cylinder turbocharged engines. A total of three chassis were built during the year. The D6 was trendsetting in the way that its chassis was shaped aerodynamically at the front end so that separate bodywork was no longer needed. In the years to follow this design philosophy became the standard in Formula One; McLaren was one of the last top teams to adopt it in 1992 on the MP4/7A.

Racing history
After running two entries the previous season, for 1983 ATS reverted to a single entry driven by German Manfred Winkelhock. Winkelhock usually qualified well but the team suffered poor reliability. Schmid, a notoriously autocratic and difficult team owner, made a number of management decisions which impacted on the team's results.

In qualifying, Winkelhock was often in the top ten on the grid. His best qualifying performance was seventh which he achieved three times, at the San Marino, Belgian and the Canadian Grand Prix respectively. However, he finished only four races, the best of these being the European Grand Prix where he placed 8th.

Complete Formula One World Championship results
(key) (Results in bold indicate pole position; results in italics indicate fastest lap)

Notes

References

ATS Formula One cars